The Bill Walsh Legacy Game is the name given to the San Jose State–Stanford football rivalry. It is a college football rivalry between the San Jose State Spartans football team of San José State University and the Stanford Cardinal football team of Stanford University. The two teams have played each other 67 times since 1900. The rivalry is currently on hiatus due to non-conference scheduling conflicts. Stanford leads the series 52–14–1.

Historical overview 
The series between San Jose State and Stanford began in 1900 with a home-and-home series between the two schools in the same season. Stanford won both games, 35–0 on October 11, 1900, in San Jose and 24–0 on October 24, 1900, at Stanford.

On November 13, 1954, San Jose State defeated Stanford for the first time by a final score of 19–14.

Throughout the over-100-year history of the series, most games in this series have been played at Stanford. Only the 1900, 1995, 2001 and 2006 games have been played in San Jose.

Stanford's longest winning streak in this series is 11, beginning in 1900 and ending in 1953. This win streak covered the first 11 games in the series. San Jose State's longest winning streak is three, achieved from 1981 to 1983 and again from 1998 to 2000.

The games from 1979 to 1982 pitted Stanford star quarterback John Elway against his father, Jack Elway, who served as the SJSU head football coach from 1979 to 1983. The two teams split the series 2–2, with the younger Elway defeating his father's team in 1979 and 1980, and the elder Jack Elway defeating his son's team in 1981 and 1982.

In 2007, following the death of San Jose State alumnus and former Stanford coach Bill Walsh, the near-annual game played between the two schools was renamed the Bill Walsh Legacy Game.

The 2013 game, a 34–13 win for Stanford, was the final scheduled game between the two schools, reportedly due to the two schools' inability to agree on a home-and-home arrangement for future games.

On July 23, 2014, at the Mountain West Conference football media days event, San Jose State coach Ron Caragher revealed that the two schools were having "initial conversations about resuming their football series by moving to a neutral site at the new Levi's Stadium." San Jose State athletic director Gene Bleymaier later stated: "Even if we have to look out to 2020 and beyond, I'd like to get a long-term agreement in place with Stanford."

On June 22, 2022, Stanford and San Jose State announced an agreement to renew the series with four games: At San Jose State on September 13, 2025; at Stanford on November 28, 2026; at Stanford on November 25, 2028; and at San Jose State on September 1, 2035.

Statistics

Game results

See also 
 
 List of NCAA college football rivalry games

References 

2007 establishments in California
College football rivalries in the United States
San Jose State Spartans football
Stanford Cardinal football